Troy City School District  is a public school district based in Pike County, Alabama, United States. Like many school districts in the United States, it is considered a separate government and has an entry in the US Census Bureau's twice a decade census of governments.

References

External links
 

Education in Pike County, Alabama